Magdahl is a Norwegian surname. Notable people with the surname include:

Aksel Magdahl (born 1979), Norwegian yacht racing navigator and author 
Jørn Magdahl (born 1950), Norwegian politician

Norwegian-language surnames